Bittangala is a small village in Kodagu district of Karnataka state, India.

Temples
 Methiyadippara Hanuman Temple, Perumbadi

Location
Perumpadi is located near Virajpet town on Gonikoppal road. It is located at a distance of 170 km from the port city of Mangalore.

Administration
Bittangala is administered from Virajpet Taluk.  It is five km from Virajpet.

Suburbs and villages
 Balugodu, 5 km
 Ammathi, 8 km
 Chembebellur, 8 km

Schools
 G.H.P.School, Bittangala

References

Villages in Kodagu district